Alan Avery Allen Horsley is a retired Anglican priest and author in the 20th century.

He was born on 13 May 1936, educated at St Chad's College, Durham   and Queen's College, Edgbaston and ordained in  1961. His first posts were curacies in Daventry, Reading and Wokingham. He then held incumbencies at Yeadon, Heyford and Stowe, Oakham and  Lanteglos-by-Fowey. He was Provost of St Andrew's Cathedral, Inverness from 1988 to 1991 and finally  Rural Dean of Rickmansworth until his retirement in 2001.

Notes

1936 births
Alumni of St Chad's College, Durham
Alumni of the Queen's Foundation
Provosts of Inverness Cathedral
Living people